Begonia palmata is a species of plant in the genus Begonia of the family Begoniaceae. It is a small herb of height 20–90 cm tall. It is found in moist places, next to streams  or under the shade. It is found in many parts of Asia, including eastern Himalayas.

Description
Begonia palmata is an herb growing 20–90 cm tall.

Distribution
Northeast India, Fujian, Guangdong etc. (check the reference for complete list)  up to elevation of 100–3200 meters

Gallery

References

palmata
Flora of China
Flora of Assam (region)
Flora of Bangladesh
Flora of East Himalaya
Flora of Indo-China
Flora of Nepal
Flora of Taiwan